Vincent Zhou (born October 25, 2000) is an American figure skater. He is a 2022 Olympic Games team event silver medalist, a two-time World bronze medalist (2019, 2022), the 2019 Four Continents bronze medalist, the 2021 CS Nebelhorn Trophy champion, the 2021 Skate America champion, the 2018 CS Tallinn Trophy silver medalist, the 2017 CS Finlandia Trophy silver medalist, and a three-time U.S. national silver medalist (2017, 2019, 2021).

He is also the 2017 World Junior champion, a three-time Junior Grand Prix event silver medalist, and the 2013 U.S. junior national champion.

In February 2018, Zhou became the first person to successfully land a quadruple Lutz jump at the Olympics. He finished sixth in PyeongChang.

Personal life
Vincent Zhou was born in San Jose, California. Both of his parents are originally from China. His older sister, Vivian, is a violinist and diver. His mother, Fei Ge, and his father, Max Zhou, are both computer scientists and worked in Silicon Valley. When Zhou was a baby, his family moved to Palo Alto, California, where they continue to reside. Zhou moved with his mother to Colorado Springs, Colorado in the spring of 2015 and returned to California a year later. He has since returned to Colorado Springs, where he spends most of his time. He had a Siamese tabby cat named Snookie. He volunteers regularly.

Zhou attended Capistrano Connections Academy, an online school, to accommodate his training. He received the Presidential Award for Educational Excellence, a recognition awarded at the sole discretion of his school principal.  Zhou enrolled at Brown University in the fall of 2019.

Skating career

Early years 
Zhou started skating in 2005. As a young child, he had lessons with Julie Lowndes and Charlie Tickner. He was coached by Diana Miro at the juvenile level and represented the Peninsula Skating Club until the 2011–2012 season. When he was nine, Zhou started to be coached by Tammy Gambill and became a member of the All Year Figure Skating Club in Riverside, California. Zhou admires Patrick Chan, Brian Boitano, Michael Weiss, Yuzuru Hanyu, and Richard Dornbush.

He won three national titles at different levels in three consecutive years:
2011 U.S. intermediate champion (youngest U.S. intermediate champion)
2012 U.S. novice champion
2013 U.S. junior champion (youngest U.S. junior champion)

Zhou intended to skate at the senior level in the 2013–2014 season, but missed the season due to an injury. He was also forced to sit out the entire 2014–15 season because of a torn lateral meniscus in his right knee and a discoid meniscus. Zhou underwent surgery at the UCSF Orthopedic Institute in San Francisco to get his injuries treated.

In the spring of 2015, Zhou began training at the Broadmoor Skating Club in Colorado Springs, Colorado with Tom Zakrajsek and Becky Calvin as his new coaches. In May 2015, he returned to competition at the Santa Fe Skatefest.

2015–2016 season
Making his ISU Junior Grand Prix debut, Zhou won two silver medals at the 2015 JGP events in Bratislava, Slovakia, and Linz, Austria. These results qualified him for the 2015–16 JGP Final in Barcelona, where he finished fourth.

In January 2016, Zhou placed 8th on the senior level at the U.S. Championships and was named in the U.S. team to the World Junior Championships in Debrecen, Hungary. He placed fourth in both segments at the March event and fifth overall.

2016–2017 season
Zhou changed coaches ahead of the 2016–2017 season, returning to Tammy Gambill. He has continued to train in Colorado Springs with one of his primary coaches, Drew Meekins and Tom Zakrajsek. Starting his season on the Junior Grand Prix series, he won silver in Yokohama, Japan, having ranked first in the short and second in the free behind South Korea's Cha Jun-hwan, and then bronze in Tallinn, Estonia. In December, he made his senior international debut at the 2016 CS Golden Spin of Zagreb but withdrew after the short program.

Competing as a senior, Zhou won the silver medal at the U.S. Championships in January 2017. The following month, he stood on his first senior international podium, taking gold at the Bavarian Open. In March, he won the gold medal at the 2017 World Junior Championships. After placing 5th in the short program, he moved up to win the title with a personal best free skate.

2017–2018 season 
Zhou opened the season at the Finlandia Trophy, where he scored 6th in the short program, then moved up to a second-place finish behind China's Boyang Jin after winning the free skate. He made his senior Grand Prix debut, having received assignments to the 2017 Cup of China and 2017 Internationaux de France. In China, he scored 8th in the short program and 2nd in the free skate, landing just three points short of the podium; in France, he fell on the quads in his short program, ending up 10th in the short and 9th overall.
After intense training and a shoulder dislocation, Zhou headed to the 2018 U.S. Figure Skating Championships, where he attempted a total of seven quadruple jumps. He took 5th in the short program and 3rd in the free skate, taking the bronze medal. His total score was just 0.68 points behind silver medalist Ross Miner.

Alongside Nathan Chen and Adam Rippon, Zhou was named to the U.S. Olympic figure skating team to Pyeongchang, South Korea. During his short program on February 16, he became the first skater to land a quadruple Lutz jump at the Olympics. After the free program, he ultimately placed 6th, behind US national champion Nathan Chen.

In April 2018, Zhou announced on Instagram that he and his choreographer Joshua Farris completed a new exhibition program to A-ha's "Take On Me". Zhou noted he had grown fond of the song while reading Ernest Cline's Ready Player One.

2018–2019 season 
At his first event of the season, the 2018 CS U.S. International Classic, Zhou placed sixth in the short, first in the free, and fourth overall.

Zhou's assignments for the 2018-19 Grand Prix series are Skate America and NHK Trophy. At the 2018 Skate America, Zhou placed six in the short, third in the free, and fifth overall. At the 2018 NHK Trophy, Zhou placed fifth in the short,  fourth in the free, and fourth overall.  In late November, Zhou competed at the 2018 CS Tallinn Trophy, where he won the silver medal.

At the 2019 US Championships, he won the silver medal after placing third in the short program and second in the free skate. He said, "I’m happy with the results, but there is still so much room for improvement,” That gives me hope for the future because to achieve what I did this week and still have room for growth is a good thing. I look forward to Four Continents and the World Championships." He was assigned to compete at the 2019 Four Continents Championships in early February and the 2019 World Championships in March.

At the 2019 Four Continents Championships, Zhou ranked first in the short with a personal best score of 100.18 and fifth in the free.  He won the bronze medal, achieving his first podium finish at an ISU Championship.  Speaking afterward, he said, "I thought that I skated great today. The most important thing that I got from today was the love for the sport. The audience was absolutely incredible, and they helped me feel good about how I skated. I think that I did a good job at this competition and I made many improvements upon my previous performances. I did a very good quad Lutz at the beginning, but then my mind got a little blurry going into the quad Salchow, and that could have been better.".

At the 2019 World Championships, Zhou scored a new season's best of 186.99, placing third in the free skate, and won the bronze medal. Afterward, he stated, "I do not think there is one stone left unturned when it came to the organization itself; everyone here has been so kind and so supportive. I am super proud that I was able to put together two strong performances, and I built upon what has been made on the nationals and Four Continents. To end the season like this is really incredible. It has been the first time since 1996 since two Americans have been on a podium, and I think it is really noteworthy. I am really honored to compete here and having the opportunity to skate here in Japan."  Zhou concluded the season as part of the gold medal-winning Team USA at the 2019 World Team Trophy.

2019–2020 season 
Zhou left his longtime coach Tom Zakrajsek, announcing that he would train with Tammy Gambill in the United States and also with Japanese coach Mie Hamada, who he had been working with for some time previously.  Zhou chose to attend Brown University, stating that the curriculum was flexible enough that it would be viable to both skate and study.

Zhou debuted at the 2019 CS U.S. Classic, placing first in the short program but dropping to the bronze medal position after a fourth-place free skate.  He withdrew from both of his Grand Prix assignments for the year, stating that they conflicted with adequate preparation for his midterm examinations.  In January 2020, Zhou announced that he would take a gap year from Brown University for the following season, and would henceforth be coached by Hamada, Lee Barkell and choreographer Lori Nichol at the Granite Club in Toronto.

Only able to train for approximately four weeks before the 2020 U.S. Championships, he nevertheless placed fourth in the short program.  Fourth in the free skate as well, he won the pewter medal.  Zhou performed only one quadruple jump in each program, saying that he had only started to land them the week of the competition.  Despite his fourth place, he was assigned to one of the United States' three men's berths at the 2020 World Championships. The World Championships were subsequently canceled as a result of the coronavirus pandemic.

2020–2021 season 
The pandemic caused Zhou to conclude that his coaching arrangement in Toronto was no longer viable due to restrictions on international travel. He parted ways with Barkell, saying he had been refreshed by his time at the Granite Club.  With Japan also not an option, he returned to Colorado Springs and former coaches Krall and Zakrajsek.  He was assigned to compete at the 2020 Skate America in Las Vegas, the ISU having made Grand Prix assignments based primarily on training location to minimize travel. Zhou placed second in the short program, despite landing his quad Salchow on the quarter mark.  He was second in the free skate as well despite falling on his opening underrotated quad Lutz and underrotating another quad Salchow attempt, taking the silver medal behind Nathan Chen and ahead of Keegan Messing. On winning his first Grand Prix medal, he said, "obviously, there were a few hiccups in the program, but overall, I’m really proud of myself for what I did at this competition."

Zhou competed next at the 2021 U.S. Championships, also held in Las Vegas. He placed second in the short program, landing both a quad Lutz and a quad Salchow. Second in the free skate, despite two errors on quad attempts, he won the silver medal.  He was assigned to the American team for the 2021 World Championships in Stockholm. At Worlds, Zhou struggled on all three jumping passes in the short program and failed to land a single fully rotated jump. He finished 25th overall and missed qualifying for the free skating segment by less than a quarter of a point. While fellow American skaters Chen and Jason Brown placed first and seventh in the event, Zhou's failure to qualify for the free skate meant that the United States only qualified two men's berths for the 2022 Winter Olympics outright, with the necessity of competing for a third later in the year at the 2021 CS Nebelhorn Trophy.

2021–2022 season 
After winning the Skating Club of Boston's Cranberry Cup event, Zhou was assigned as the American men's entry to the 2021 CS Nebelhorn Trophy to secure a third Olympic berth for the United States. Zhou placed first in both programs to win the event.

At his first Grand Prix assignment of the season, the 2021 Skate America, Zhou skated two clean programs, including landing five quads in his free skate, to win both segments of competition and take the gold medal overall in what was considered an upset victory over compatriot Nathan Chen, who finished third after numerous mistakes. Chen had been undefeated for over three years prior. Zhou said afterward that he "didn't really expect this result, but what I did expect of myself was to be as well-prepared and well-trained as I possibly could, and I think just focusing on that every single day at home led to making the seemingly impossible become possible." His second assignment, the 2021 NHK Trophy, was widely considered a contest between Zhou and Skate America silver medalist Shoma Uno due to Yuzuru Hanyu having had to withdraw from the event due to injury. Zhou placed narrowly second in the short program, 3.07 points behind Uno, but had a poor free skate, singling a planned quad Lutz to open, underrotating three other jumps, and receiving quarter calls on three others. He pronounced himself "very disappointed and made a lot of mistakes and wish I could have done better and capitalize on this opportunity. This is not representative of my training." Zhou's results qualified him to the Grand Prix Final, but it was subsequently canceled due to restrictions prompted by the Omicron variant.

Zhou placed second with a clean skate in the short program at the 2022 U.S. Championships. He struggled in the free skate, making several errors on quadruple jumps and falling on his triple Axel attempt, placing fourth in that segment and narrowly third overall, 0.38 points ahead of pewter medalist Jason Brown. Zhou said, "the simplest answer is that I was just so nervous that my body froze up on me. I'm really disappointed in myself" Despite this personal disappointment, he was named to his second American Olympic team.

Beginning the 2022 Winter Olympics as the American entry in the men's free skate segment of the Olympic team event, Zhou popped a planned quadruple flip early in the program but rallied to complete three more quads and three Level 4 spins. With 171.44 points, Zhou ranked third in the segment and added eight team points en route to a silver medal finish for the Americans. Zhou received two positive tests for COVID-19 afterward and announced that he would have to withdraw from the men's event. Zhou called the turn of events "pretty unreal." Zhou was not allowed to participate in the closing ceremony despite testing negative for 14 straight days and having antibodies.

Following a disappointing Olympics, Zhou concluded the season at the 2022 World Championships in Montpellier. Zhou placed sixth in the short program but rallied to place fourth in the free skate, securing third place overall in a chaotic event. He said afterward that he was "still very upset over the loss of that opportunity at the Olympics, but I'm very grateful that I still had the chance to compete here at Worlds. I did some great things out there, and there is a lot for me to learn and grow from."

Zhou indicated that he would focus "solely on academics" in the fall but did not rule out a comeback.

Records and achievements
 First skater to land the quadruple Lutz jump at the Olympics.

Programs

Competitive highlights
GP: Grand Prix; CS: Challenger Series; JGP: Junior Grand Prix. Pewter medals (4th place) awarded only at U.S. national, sectional, and regional events.

Detailed results
Small medals for short and free programs awarded only at ISU Championships.

Junior and novice 
Small medals for short and free programs awarded only at ISU Championships. Current ISU world bests highlighted in bold and italic.

ISU Personal best highlighted in bold.

Notes
 This is somewhat debatable. In the men's short program competition at the 2018 Olympic Winter Games, a total of four competitors attempted a combination jump that included a quad lutz. Zhou was the first of the four to compete, and he did not fall on the jump combination. However, his jump combination received an under-rotation call on the second jump of the combination and a negative GOE (-1.03) on the overall element. Two skaters that competed after him in the same competition (Dmitri Aliev, an Olympic Athlete from Russia, and Boyang Jin of China) landed their quad lutz combination jumps with no calls and positive GOEs. In the men's free program competition that antecedes the short program, a total of four competitors attempted quad lutz jumps. Among them, Nathan Chen of the United States was the first to compete, and he landed a quad lutz with no calls and a positive GOE.

References

External links
 
 
 Vincent Zhou at IceNetwork.com

2000 births
American male single skaters
Living people
American sportspeople of Chinese descent
Figure skaters from San Jose, California
Sportspeople from Palo Alto, California
World Junior Figure Skating Championships medalists
Season's world number one figure skaters
Four Continents Figure Skating Championships medalists
World Figure Skating Championships medalists
Figure skaters at the 2018 Winter Olympics
Figure skaters at the 2022 Winter Olympics
Olympic silver medalists for the United States in figure skating
Medalists at the 2022 Winter Olympics